Rammu is an island in Jõelähtme Parish, Harju County in northern Estonia.

Gallery

Estonian islands in the Baltic
Gulf of Finland